Arboa berneriana is a shrub or tree that grows in the wet tropics of northern Madagascar. It has varying ranges of colors from yellow to orange to red.

Previously, A. berneriana was classified as Turnera berneriana, Erblichia berneriana, and Piriqueta berneriana . Phylogenetic analysis of Turneroideae, however, suggested it should be classified as Arboa.

References 

Passifloraceae
Flora of Madagascar
Plants described in 2012